Dolon Kalan is a village located in the Ludhiana West tehsil, of Ludhiana district, Punjab.

Administration
The village is administrated by a Sarpanch who is an elected representative of village as per constitution of India and Panchayati raj (India).

Child Sex Ratio details
The village population of children with an age group from 0-6 is 265 which makes up  9.06% of total population of village. The child Sex Ratio as per census is 866, higher than  average of 846 in the state of Punjab.

Villages in Ludhiana West Tehsil

Air travel connectivity 
The closest airport to the village is Sahnewal Airport.

References

External links
  Villages in Ludhiana West Tehsil

Villages in Ludhiana West tehsil